Savanne SC is a Mauritian football club based in Souillac, Savanne. They play in the Barclays League, the top division in Mauritian football.

They have never won the league, but have won the Mauritian Cup two times, in 2003 and 2004. They have also won the Mauritian Republic Cup once, in 2009.

Ground
Their home stadium is Stade Harry Latour (cap. 2,000) in Mahébourg, Grand Port District.

Achievements
Mauritian Cup: 2
2003, 2004

Mauritian Republic Cup: 1
2009

Performance in CAF competitions
CAF Confederation Cup: 1 appearance
2005 – Preliminary Round

External links
Facebook Page
zerozerofootball Profile

References

Football clubs in Mauritius
2000 establishments in Mauritius
Association football clubs established in 2000